The 2011 Pittsburgh Riverhounds season will be the club's thirteenth year of existence, as well as their twelfth season of playing professional soccer. This year, the Riverhounds will be playing in the newly created USL Professional Division, which encompasses the third tier of  third-tier of American soccer.

Previously, the Riverhounds played in the tentative USSF D2 Pro League, where they finished third overall in the second division table and made the semifinal round of the playoffs.

Review and events

Match results

Legend

USL Pro

U.S. Open Cup

Club

Roster 
As at June 10, 2011

Management and staff 

  Justin Evans - Head Coach
  John Rotz-  Assistant Coach
  Jeroen Walstra - Goalkeeper Coach
  Jason Kutney - Chief Executive Officer/Director of Youth Development
  Gene Klein - Technical Director

Statistics

Transfers

In

Awards

References 

2011
Pittsburgh Riverhounds
Pittsburgh Riverhounds
Pittsburgh Riverhounds